C. Leigh Purtill (b. May 26,) is an American author of young adult fiction.

Biography
Purtill was born in Frankfurt, Germany and grew up on the east coast of the United States, mostly in the suburbs of Connecticut and Pennsylvania.   Purtill graduated from Mount Holyoke College with degrees in anthropology and dance. She graduated magna cum laude and Phi Beta Kappa. She later received a Master of Science in film production at Boston University.  Film work took her to New York City where she became a script supervisor on films, music videos and commercials.

In early 2000, she moved to Los Angeles with her husband where she worked as a broadcast standards editor (network censor) for The WB Television Network later renamed The CW Television Network on such shows as The Gilmore Girls and 7th Heaven.

Purtill currently resides in West Hollywood with her husband.  Her latest book, Chasing the Falls, was self-published after having two books published by Penguin Group the author decided to go it alone.

Bibliography

Novels
Chasing the Falls (2012)
Jennifer Aniston is My Best Friend - AKA: Love, Meg (2007 -2012)

Fat Girls in L.A. series
Fat Girls in L.A. (Book 1: All About Vee) - AKA: All About Vee (2008 - 2011) 
Fat Girls in L.A. (Book 2: The Rise of Ginny) (forthcoming 2012)

References

External links 
 Official web site
 Leigh's Official Blog
 Penguin Publishing Author Page of C. Leigh Purtill
 Little Willow Author Interview with C. Leigh Purtill

21st-century American novelists
American women novelists
People from Connecticut
Writers from Brooklyn
Living people
Mount Holyoke College alumni
Boston University College of Communication alumni
Writers from Los Angeles
21st-century American women writers
Novelists from New York (state)
Year of birth missing (living people)